This is a list of ambassadors to Austria. Note that some ambassadors are responsible for more than one country while others are directly accredited to Vienna.

Current Ambassadors to Vienna

See also
 Foreign relations of Austria
 List of diplomatic missions of Austria
 List of diplomatic missions in Austria

References
 Directory of the Diplomatic Corps and other representations in Austria
 Directory of Consular representations in Austria

 
 
Austria